Mixojapyx tridenticulatus is a species of forcepstail in the family Japygidae. It is found in North America.

Subspecies
These two subspecies belong to the species Mixojapyx tridenticulatus:
 Mixojapyx tridenticulatus superior Silvestri, 1948
 Mixojapyx tridenticulatus tridenticulatus (Fox, 1941)

References

Diplura
Articles created by Qbugbot
Animals described in 1941